The English Civil War was fought between the Royalists (Cavaliers) and Parliamentarians (Roundheads) between 1642 and 1651.

English Civil War may also refer to:

Military conflict
 First English Civil War (1642–46)
First English Civil War, 1642
First English Civil War, 1643
First English Civil War, 1644
First English Civil War, 1645
First English Civil War, 1646
 Second English Civil War (1648–49)
 Third English Civil War (1649–51)

Other uses
 "English Civil War" (song), a 1979 song by The Clash

See also
 List of English civil wars
 List of wars involving England